Alfred Rode (born Alfred Spedaliere; 4 June 1905 – 22 July 1979) was an Italian-born French composer, musician, actor and film director. He was born in Torre del Greco. In 1936 Rode appeared in the British film Gypsy Melody alongside Lupe Vélez, which was a remake of his own 1935 film Juanita. Rode was married to the French actress Claudine Dupuis from 1951.

Selected filmography

Director
 The Blue Danube (1940)
 Secret Cargo (1947)
 It's the Paris Life (1954)
 Secret File 1413 (1962)

Actor
 Carnival (1931)
 The Blue Danube (1932)
 Juanita (1935)
 Antonia (1935)
 Gypsy Melody (1936)
 The Blue Danube (1940)
 Tourbillon (1953)
 It's the Paris Life (1954)

References

Bibliography
 Vogel, Michelle. Lupe Velez: The Life and Career of Hollywood's Mexican Spitfire. McFarland, 2012.

External links

1905 births
1979 deaths
French male screenwriters
20th-century French screenwriters
French male film actors
French film directors
French male composers
Italian male film actors
Italian film directors
20th-century French male actors
20th-century Italian male actors
20th-century French composers
20th-century Italian composers
20th-century Italian musicians
20th-century French male musicians
20th-century French male writers
Italian emigrants to France